Vishwanath Datta (1835 — 23 February 1884) was a Bengali lawyer, philanthropist and novelist. He was the father of Swami Vivekananda, Mahendranath Dutta and Bhupendranath Dutta.

Early life
Vishwanath was born in an aristocratic Hindu family of North Calcutta. His father Durgaprasad (1816—1850/55) preferred Sannyas life and left home when Vishwanath was only six years old. There is an interesting incident when he longed to return to Calcutta after five years of experiencing the tough life of a sannyasi, which Swami Vivekananda used to listen during his childhood days. 

It happened so that, in somewhere between 1845 and 1846, Durgaprasad returned to Calcutta, He was recognised by one of his neighbours who locked him in a small room in his house so that he cannot escape and remain in a desperate condition as a sannyasi. He was locked in this room for 3 days. At last, on the third day the neighbour's wife Sarita Devi took pity on him and helped him escape from the house. Later Vishwanath was brought up by his uncle. He entered in Gourmohan Addy's school or Oriental Seminary. After completion of graduation, in 1859, Datta worked as a clerk under an attorney, Charles Peter.

Career
Datta was an enlightened person of the 19th century, free from religious superstitions, known for his charity and liberal outlook. He was well versed in Sanskrit, Hindi, Persian, Arabic and Urdu languages. 

He married Bhuvaneswari Devi in 1851 and had nine children. Narendranath Dutta, his sixth child and second son, who later became famous as Swami Vivekananda, was born in 1863. 

In 1866 he applied for the post of proctor to Barnes Peacock, the first Chief Justice of Calcutta High Court. His prayer was approved by Justice Walter Morgan (judge). Datta also maintained a law firm in Kolkata named Dhar & Datta. Later he faced serious economic troubles for frequent litigation and lawsuits among Datta family.

Literary works
Datta wrote a Bengali autobiographical novel named Sulochana based on a joint family dispute. In 1882 the novel was first published in Kolkata (then "Calcutta").

References

External links 

1835 births
1884 deaths
Bengali novelists
Bengali Hindus
19th-century Bengalis
Oriental Seminary alumni
19th-century Indian lawyers